Damage (Jaime Ortiz) is a fictional character, a supervillain appearing in American comic books published by Marvel Comics. He is an enemy of the Punisher and Wolverine.

Publication history
Created by Carl Potts and Jim Lee, the character made his first appearance in The Punisher War Journal #8 (September 1989),

Damage's first appearance was as a gang leader in The Punisher War Journal #8. After nearly dying in that issue, the character was rebuilt into a cyborg in a story arc that lasted from The Punisher War Journal #17-20 to Wolverine and the Punisher: Damaging Evidence #1-3.

Damage received a profile in Marvel Encyclopedia #5, which revealed his real name is Jaime Ortiz.

Fictional character biography
The head of a Manhattan street gang known as the Bunsen Burners, Damage became aware that the Punisher was after him, so he decided to make a preemptive strike against the vigilante by hijacking or destroying his Battle Van. While his underlings were killed by the Battle Van's automated defenses, Damage made it into the vehicle, where he was ensnared and crippled by its mechanical tentacles and coils. The trapped Damage was later found by the Punisher, who dropped him off at a hospital, having concluded that letting Damage live out the rest of his life in the mangled state he was in would be punishment enough.

The Arranger, having been given the assignment of finding and recruiting new assassins for the Kingpin, discovered Damage through a newspaper article, and arranged for him to be moved to a private clinic, where surgeons set about reconstructing him into a cyborg. When Damage began to die on the operating table, the Arranger inspired him to continue fighting for survival by reminding him of his hatred for the Punisher.

When Damage's transformation was complete, he was further augmented by technology supplied by Donald Pierce, and made to resemble the Punisher, in order to frame him for a series of murders. The killings drew the attention of Wolverine, who tracked Damage down to a chemical plant, where the two fought. Damage had the upper hand until the Punisher, who was preoccupied with the Sniper, suddenly appeared and set Damage ablaze before knocking him into a vat of flammable chemicals, which exploded and killed him. The Kingpin had Damage's remains recovered, and sent them to Pierce, along with fifty million dollars to pay for his reconstruction.

Powers and abilities
As a cyborg, Damage possessed superhuman strength and durability, as well as numerous retractable weapons such as a grenade launcher, a flamethrower, and a minigun. He also had infrared vision, and could electrocute others by touching them.

In other media

Video games
 Damage appears in the 2005 Punisher video game, voiced by Steven Blum. He is the leader of a gang of small-time drug pushers, and the owner of a crack house. After fighting his way through Damage's men, the Punisher interrogates him, learning from Damage that someone tipped him off that the Punisher was targeting him. When Damage admits he doesn't know who called him, the Punisher drops him off of a multi-story ledge to his death.

References

External links
 Damage at Marvel Wiki
 Damage at Comic Vine
 
 

Marvel Comics cyborgs
Fictional gangsters
Punisher characters
Fictional assassins in comics
Fictional characters with disfigurements
Fictional mass murderers
Fictional murdered people
Marvel Comics supervillains
Characters created by Jim Lee
Comics characters introduced in 1989
Fictional characters from New York City
Marvel Comics characters with superhuman strength
Fictional characters with electric or magnetic abilities